Luis Rocha may also refer to:
 Luís Rocha (footballer, born 1986), Portuguese footballer
 Luís Rocha (footballer, born 1993), Portuguese footballer
 Luís Filipe Rocha (born 1947), Portuguese film director, screenwriter and actor
 Luis M. Rocha, Portuguese-American scientist
 Luís Miguel Rocha (1976–2015), Portuguese author, television writer and producer
 Luís Rocha (politician) (1937–2001), Brazilian politician and lawyer